Shelton Joseph Fabre is an American prelate of the Catholic Church who has served as the Archbishop of Louisville in Kentucky since March 30, 2022. He served as bishop of the Diocese of Houma-Thibodaux in Louisiana from 2013 to 2022 and was auxiliary bishop of the Archdiocese of New Orleans in Louisiana from 2007 to 2013.

Early life and education
Shelton Fabre was born in New Roads, Louisiana, on October 25 1963. He attended primary and secondary schools in New Roads, graduating in 1981 as valedictorian of Catholic High School of Pointe Coupée. He then entered Saint Joseph Seminary College in St. Benedict, Louisiana, graduating with a bachelor's degree in history in 1985.

Fabre then continued his formation at the American College of Louvain in Leuven, Belgium, while studying at the Katholieke Universiteit Leuven.  He earned a Bachelor of Religious Studies degree in 1987 and a Master of Religious Studies degree in 1989. Fabre was ordained a deacon on December 10, 1988 by Archbishop Peter Gerety at the Sint Jan-de-Doper Church at the university.

Priesthood

Fabre was ordained a priest on August 5, 1989 by Bishop Stanley Ott for the Diocese of Baton Rouge at St. Joseph Cathedral in Baton Rouge.

Fabre served as assistant pastor of the Louisiana parishes of:

 St. Alphonsus Liguori in Greenwell Springs (1989 to 1992) 
 St. George in Baton Rouge (1992 to 1994)
 St. Isidore the Farmer in Baker (1994 to 1995)
 St. Joseph Cathedral (1995 to 1996)

Fabre later served as pastor at both St. Joseph Parish in Grosse Tete, Louisiana, and Immaculate Heart of Mary Parish in Maringouin, Louisiana. In 2004, Fabre became pastor of Sacred Heart of Jesus Parish in Baton Rouge. 

Fabre's diocesan positions during this period were as chaplain at Louisiana State Penitentiary at Angola in 1994, director of the Office of Black Catholics (1990-2005) and defender of the bond for the Marriage Tribunal (1994 to 2007). Fabre was elected to serve on the diocesan Clergy Personnel Board and served as chair of the Pastoral Planning Committee of the diocese. He at various times took on the roles of chaplain to St. Joseph's Academy, dean of the Northwest Deanery. Fabre also served as a member of the College of Consultors, the Presbyteral Council, and the Diocesan School Board.

Auxiliary bishop of New Orleans 
On December 13, 2006, Fabre was appointed titular bishop of Pudentiana and auxiliary bishop of the Archdiocese of New Orleans by Pope Benedict XVI. He was consecrated by Archbishop Alfred Hughes on February 28, 2007 in New Orleans. He was the youngest bishop in the U.S. at the time. As auxiliary bishop, Fabre served as vicar general and moderator of the curia. He also became pastor of Our Lady of the Rosary Parish in New Orleans.

In October 2009, Fabre met with each of the plaintiffs in a lawsuit against the archdiocese that had been recently settled for $5 million.  The plaintiffs had been beaten and abused in the 1950's and 1960's by nuns, priests and other staff members at Hope Haven and Madonna Manor, two Catholic homes for troubled youth. Fabre held the meetings to apologize for their treatment

Bishop of Houma-Thibodaux 

On September 23, 2013, Pope Francis appointed Fabre as bishop of the Diocese of Houma-Thibodaux. He was installed at the Cathedral of St. Francis de Sales on October 30, 2013.

On May 4, 2018, Fabre became chair of the Ad-Hoc Committee against Racism of the United States Conference of Catholic Bishops. On November 6, 2018, Fabre released "Open Wide our Hearts: The Enduring Call to Love", a pastoral letter addressing racism issues in the United States and the Catholic response.

On January 11, 2019, Fabre released a list of 14 priests with credible accusations of sexual abuse against minors. The list went back to 1977, when the diocese are founded. Fabre added this statement:

In 2020, after the murder of George Floyd and subsequent protests, Fabre and other Catholic bishops issued a statement with a special emphasis on the Solemnity of Pentecost:

Archbishop of Louisville 
On February 8, 2022, Pope Francis named Fabre as archbishop of the Archdiocese of Louisville. He was installed on March 30, 2022.

See also

 Catholic Church hierarchy
 Catholic Church in the United States
 Historical list of the Catholic bishops of the United States
 List of Catholic bishops of the United States
 Lists of patriarchs, archbishops, and bishops

References

External links
 
 

 

  

Living people
1963 births
KU Leuven alumni
People from New Roads, Louisiana
People from Pointe Coupee Parish, Louisiana
Catholics from Louisiana
21st-century Roman Catholic bishops in the United States
African-American Roman Catholic bishops
21st-century African-American people
20th-century African-American people
Bishops appointed by Pope Francis
African-American Roman Catholic archbishops